Lester George is an internationally renowned golf course architect who was born in Wiesbaden, Germany in 1955 while his father was stationed there by the United States Air Force.

After attending The University of Richmond, where he founded the school's orienteering team, George settled in Richmond, Virginia. Following college graduation in 1977, he spent four years in the army as an artillery officer, subsequently received his master's degree from the United States Army Command and General Staff College and remained in the Army Reserves until retiring a lieutenant colonel in 2003. This military career coincided with the development of his career as a golf course architect.

Prior to opening his own firm in 1991, George studied with other golf course architects at Golf Services International learning all aspects of golf course design and construction. He attended the Harvard Design School, Golf Course Architecture in 1992, which launched his solo career. George's company, George Golf Design, Inc., is located in Midlothian, Virginia, just outside Richmond.  George is a member of the  American Society of Golf Course Architects.

George has developed a niche in renovating and restoring classic golf courses designed by some of the most revered golden age architects such as MacDonald, Raynor, Tillinghast, Ross, Flynn, Tull and Wilson - and he has worked with many of the most historic and well-regarded golf facilities on the East Coast (see project listings below).

Lester George donated much time and effort to the First Tee Program designing and overseeing construction of The First Tee of Chesterfield, the premiere 18-hole First Tee course in the United States.

Using abandoned landfills as a canvas, George successfully transforming two brownfields into golf courses—converting overgrown hazardous areas into plush, green recreational turf.  One of these courses, Lambert's Point Golf Course in Norfolk, Virginia, won an Affinity Award for Environmental Stewardship from the Golf Course Builders Association of America.

George's renovation of the Raptor course at Langley Air Force Base posed a challenge when thousands of unexploded bombs were discovered on the site once excavation began.

George's projects have won numerous awards:

Ballyhack Golf Club, Roanoke, VA 
 #3, Best New Private Course of 2009, Golf Magazine  
 Top Ten Best New Courses, Golf Magazine  
 Top Ten Best New Courses, Links Magazine  
 Top 20 Premiere Clubs in American Golf, Links Magazine 
 
The Colonial Golf Course, Williamsburg, VA 
 The Top Ten You Can Play, Golf Magazine One of The Best New Courses in America, The Golfer Magazine 
 Top 100 Reasons to Play Golf, The Washington Golf Monthly 
 
Kinloch Golf Club, Manakin‐Sabot, VA 
 Hosted US Senior Amateur in 2011  
 Best New Private Course of 2001, Golf Digest #1 Course in Virginia, Golf Digest #4, Readers Choice Awards, Golf World  
 # 9 ‐ # 23, 100 Greatest Modern Golf Courses, GolfWeek #13, Top 100 Modern Courses, GolfWeek  
 #33 of 100 Greatest Courses, Golf Digest  
 #48, Top 100 in America, Golf Digest  
 Top 18 One‐Time Collaborations in Golf Course Architecture, Links Magazine  
 Top 20 Premiere Clubs in American Golf, Links Magazine 
 
The James River Course at The Country Club of Virginia, Richmond, VA 
 #5, Best New Remodel of 2005, Golf Digest 
 
Lamberts Point, Norfolk, VA 
 Environmental Stewardship Affinity Award, Golf Course Builders Association of America 
  
Lakeview Golf Course, Harrisonburg, VA 
 Best Places to Play, Golf Digest  
 Valley's Best Golf Course, Daily News Record 
 
The Newport Bay Course at Ocean City Golf & Yacht Club, Berlin, MD 
 Top 100 Reasons to Play Golf, The Washington Golf Monthly 
 
The Old White Course at The Greenbrier, White Sulphur Springs, WV 
 Best New Public Remodel of 2007, Golf Digest 2006 Legacy Award #12 Resort Course, Conde Nast Traveler  
 Best Restoration, Golf Course Builders Association  
 One of 100 Greatest Classic Golf Courses, GolfWeek  
 Hosting the PGA Tour's Greenbrier Classic 
  
Providence Golf Course 
 Rated 4 ½ Stars by Golf Digest Magazine  
 Rated Second Best Golf Course in Richmond Area, Richmond Times Dispatch 
 
Rock Manor Golf Course, Wilmington, DE 
 Best Public Golf Course, Delaware Today 
 
Willow Oaks Country Club, Richmond, VA 
 #8, Best New Remodel of 2008, Golf Digest Magazine 
 Hosted State Open Tournament
  
Lester George 
 One of the Course Architects of Year, The Board Room Magazine   
 Achievement in Golf Course Design, ING Industry Honors   
 One of the Leading Young Architects in the Country, Golf World 
 Design Excellence Award, American Society of Golf Course Architects

Lester George's golf course designs include the following:

External links
George's ASGCA biography
George's company website
The Colonial Golf Club reference
Kinloch Golf Club reference
Lambert's Point Golf Course reference
Ballyhack Golf Club reference
The First Tee reference

References

1955 births
Living people
Harvard Graduate School of Design alumni
American architects
Landscape architecture
University of Richmond alumni